Calochilus sandrae, commonly known as the brownish beard orchid, is a species of orchid endemic to the higher parts of southern New South Wales. It has a single greenish brown leaf with a reddish base and up to five brownish green flowers with red striations and a labellum with a brownish purple "beard".

Description
The leaf is fully developed at flowering time. Individual flowers last for between two and five days. The lateral sepals are a similar length but narrower and spread apart from each other. The column has two yellowish "eyes" joined by a purplish ridge. Flowering occurs from December to January.

Taxonomy and naming
Calochilus sandrae was first formally described in 2006 by David Jones from a specimen he collected near Nimmitabel and the description was published in Australian Orchid Research. The specific epithet (sandrae) honours Sandra Raelene Jones who discovered the species.

Distribution and habitat
The brownish beard orchid grows in shrubby montane forest between Nimmitabel and the Wadbilliga National Park in New South Wales and in the Namadgi National Park in the Australian Capital Territory.

References

sandrae
Flora of New South Wales
Endemic orchids of Australia
Plants described in 2006